Schnellin is a village and a former municipality in Wittenberg district in Saxony-Anhalt, Germany. Since 1 July 2009, it is part of the town Bad Schmiedeberg.

Geography

Location 
Schnellin lies about 17 km southeast of Lutherstadt Wittenberg on the edge of the Düben Heath Nature Park.

Constituent communities 
Schnellin has one of these: Merkwitz.

History 
Schnellin had its first documentary mention in 1388 under the name Slenyn.

Regular events 
The village festival is held yearly at Whitsun weekend.

Economy and transportation
Federal Highway (Bundesstraße) B 182 between Wittenberg and Torgau is about 2 km away.

External links 
Verwaltungsgemeinschaft's website

Former municipalities in Saxony-Anhalt
Bad Schmiedeberg